Protrinemuroides is a genus of silverfish in the family Protrinemuridae. It only comprises the type species Protrinemuroides celebicus Mendes, 2002, found on the Indonesian island of Sulawesi.

References

Further reading

 
 

Insect genera
Articles created by Qbugbot